Alpiscorpius dinaricus is a scorpion species distributed in Albania, Bosnia and Herzegovina, Croatia, Montenegro and Serbia.

References 

Euscorpiidae
Scorpions of Europe